Christopher Church (4 October 1940 – 1 May 2001) was a British cyclist. He competed in the men's sprint and men's tandem events at the 1964 Summer Olympics.

References

1940 births
2001 deaths
British male cyclists
Olympic cyclists of Great Britain
Cyclists at the 1964 Summer Olympics